Scissors are a tool used for cutting.

Scissor or scissors may also refer to:

Geography
 Scissors, Texas

In popular culture
 Scissor Sisters, a pop band
 Scissors (film), a 1991 movie
 Nightmare (2000 film), aka Scissors, a 2000 South Korean horror film
 Scissors, a manga by Takashi Hashiguchi
 Kamen Rider Scissors, character from Kamen Rider Ryuki
 Scissors (Blood on the Dance Floor album)
 "Scissors", a song from Slipknot's 1999 album Slipknot

Games
 Scissors (game)
 Rock-paper-scissors
 Scissors, the code name for Alara Reborn, a Magic: The Gathering set

Science, engineering and aviation
 Scissor doors, a type of automobile door
 Scissoring (chemistry), a type of motion especially relevant to chemical bonds
 Scissors or scissors crossover or scissors crossing, a configuration of railway track
 The Scissors, an aerial combat manoeuvre
 Scissor (fish), a genus of characid fish
 Scissors mechanism, also known as a pantograph, a type of mechanical linkage

Sports and physical activities
 Scissors jump, a name for a high jump method
 Scissors, an attacking move in rugby league football, see Glossary of rugby league terms
 Scissor kick, also known as the bicycle kick, an aerial kick in association football (soccer)
 Pommel horse, a male gymnastics exercise also known as Scissors
 Tribadism, a sex act also known as scissoring
 Scissor (gladiator), a type of Ancient Rome gladiator